Clay Township is one of the twenty-two townships of Tuscarawas County, Ohio, United States.  The 2000 census found 1,981 people in the township, 721 of whom lived in the unincorporated portions of the township.

Geography
Located in the southern part of the county, it borders the following townships:
York Township - north
Warwick Township - northeast
Rush Township - east
Perry Township - southeast corner
Washington Township - south
Salem Township - southwest
Jefferson Township - northwest

Part of the village of Gnadenhutten is located in eastern Clay Township.

Clay Township contains the unincorporated locale of Lock Seventeen., named for its location at the seventeenth lock of the Ohio Canal.

Name and history
It is one of nine Clay Townships statewide.

Government
The township is governed by a three-member board of trustees, who are elected in November of odd-numbered years to a four-year term beginning on the following January 1. Two are elected in the year after the presidential election and one is elected in the year before it. There is also an elected township fiscal officer, who serves a four-year term beginning on April 1 of the year after the election, which is held in November of the year before the presidential election. Vacancies in the fiscal officership or on the board of trustees are filled by the remaining trustees.  The current trustees are Ruby Kinsey, Harvey Morrison, and Tom Morrison, and the fiscal officer is Sharon Miller.

References

External links
County website

Townships in Tuscarawas County, Ohio
Townships in Ohio